Pizzolato or Pizzolatto is an Italian surname. Notable people with the surname include:

Antonino Pizzolato (born 1996), Italian weightlifter
Fabio Pizzolato (born 1975), Italian pole vaulter
Henrique Pizzolato (born 1952), Brazilian politician
Nic Pizzolatto (born 1975), American novelist, screenwriter, and producer
Orlando Pizzolato (born 1958), Italian long-distance runner

Italian-language surnames